Royal blue is a deep and vivid shade of blue. It is said to have been created by clothiers in Rode, Somerset, a consortium of whom won a competition to make a dress for Queen Charlotte, consort of King George III.

Brightness
The Oxford English Dictionary defines "royal blue" as "a deep vivid blue", while the Cambridge English Dictionary defined it as "a strong, bright blue colour", and the Collins English Dictionary defines it as "a deep blue colour". US dictionaries give it as further towards purple, e.g. "a deep, vivid reddish or purplish blue" (Webster's New World College Dictionary) or "a vivid purplish blue" (Merriam-Webster).

By the 1950s, many people began to think of royal blue as a brighter color, and it is this brighter color that was chosen as the web color "royal blue" (the web colors when they were formulated in 1987 were originally known as the X11 colors). The World Wide Web Consortium designated the keyword "royalblue" to be this much brighter color, rather than the traditional darker version of royal blue.

Cree Inc. uses the term Royal Blue to describe light emitting diodes in the wavelength range 450–465 nanometers, slightly shorter than the regular blue range of 465–485 nanometers.

Variations

Queen blue

Queen blue is a medium tone of royal blue.

The first recorded use of queen blue as a color name in English was in 1926. Before that, since 1661, this color had been called queen’s blue.

Imperial blue

Imperial blue is recorded as an alternative name for the traditional royal blue color above. The name is also used for a distinct, medium blue color by Pantone.

In culture
Literature
 The color appears as the title of the book Red, White & Royal Blue by Casey McQuiston in reference to the prince of England.

Auto racing
 In auto racing, royal blue (called ‘imperial blue’) is the traditional color of Ford and Carroll Shelby, and for 2012, the primary livery for Hendrick Motorsports' #48 sponsored by Lowe's.

Flags
 Royal blue is an official color used in the flags of American Samoa, Cayman Islands, the European Union, Galicia, Georgia, Israel, New Zealand, Texas, Tuvalu, Scotland and the United Kingdom.
 The Flag of the Philippines uses a royal blue field, which is normally displayed over the red field, to signify a state of peace. Reversing this arrangement (i.e. red above blue) transforms the flag into the nation’s war ensign.

Australian rules football
 Royal blue is the primary colour of the guernseys for the North Melbourne Football Club

Football
 Royal blue is the official colour of the shirts of Birmingham City F.C., whose nickname in consequence is Blues.

American football
 Royal blue is the primary color of the uniforms for the Buffalo Bills and Los Angeles Rams of the NFL.

Ice hockey
 Royal blue is the primary color of the uniforms for the Buffalo Sabres of the NHL.

Uniforms
 When, in 2008, the United States Transportation Security Administration changed the color of airport screener uniforms from white to royal blue, they found that it made the work of the airport screeners easier because airline passengers became more compliant, apparently because by wearing blue, the airport screeners came to be perceived more as authority figures.

University
 Imperial blue is the brand colour of the Imperial College London, which is used through all College communications.
 Royal blue is the brand colour of Yonsei University, used in its emblem, flag, and various university designs.

See also 
 Cobalt blue
 Navy blue
 Shades of blue

References

Shades of azure
Shades of blue